The 1998 Dutch Open was an ATP-tournament held in Amsterdam, Netherlands. The tournament was held from August 3 to August 9.

Seeds
Champion seeds are indicated in bold text while text in italics indicates the round in which those seeds were eliminated.

Draw

Finals

References

Doubles